Vermont is a town in Saint Andrew Parish of Saint Vincent and the Grenadines. It is located in the inland southwest of the main island of Saint Vincent, north of Kingstown and east of Layou.

References

Scott, C. R. (ed.) (2005) Insight guide: Caribbean (5th edition). London: Apa Publications.

Populated places in Saint Vincent and the Grenadines